The Alphabetum Romanum, by Felice Feliciano, published in 1463, was the first book demonstrating how to create Roman square capital letters geometrically based on the subdivision of a square. 

The codex, probably printed in Verona, is the first humanistic treatise on the construction of Roman capital letters. It contains a complete Roman alphabet, two letters on each sheet, below which the rules for their design are given. The final part includes a recipe for colors. The original is hand-colored with text both in Italian and Latin with an epigram by Paolo Ramusio published in 1463 in Volume Codex Vaticanus Latinus 6852. The original is preserved in the Vatican Apostolic Library.

Many other books on the geometry of the capital Roman letters were written subsequently, such as De divina proportione 1497 by Luca Pacioli and the Champfleury by Geoffroy Tory in 1529. The study of the creation of ancient Roman square capitals form of writing, became the template for modern Letter case.

References

Further reading
 Felice Feliciano, Alphabetum Romanum. facs. ed. G. Mardersteig, Verona, 1960.
 Felice Feliciano, Alphabetum Romanum 1463. Volume Codex Vaticanus Latinus 6852 The Vatican Apostolic Library.
 On Alberti and the Art of Building, Robert Tavernor, Yale University Press London 1998
 Pacioli, Luca, De Divina Proporzione, Venice, 1509

15th-century Latin books
Typography
Latin script